

In Hurrian mythology, Ullikummi is a giant stone monster, son of Kumarbi and the sea god's daughter, Sertapsuruhi, or a female cliff. The language of the literary myth in its existing redaction is Hittite, in cuneiform texts recovered at Bogaskoy, where some Hurrian fragments of the "Song of Ullikummi" have been found. See Guterbock (1951).

The "song of Ullikummi" was recognized from its first rediscovery as a predecessor of Greek myths in Hesiod. Parallels to the Greek myth of Typhon, the ancient antagonist of the thunder-god Zeus, have been elucidated by Burkert.

The story of Ullikummi
The narrative of Ullikummi is one episode, the best preserved and most complete, in an epic cycle of related "songs" about the god Kumarbi, who aimed to replace the weather god Teshub and destroy the city of Kummiya; to this end Kumarbi fathered upon a rock cliff a genderless, deaf, blind, yet sentient volcanic rock monster, Ullikummi, which he hid in the netherworld and placed on the shoulder of Upelluri. Upelluri, absorbed in his meditations, did not feel Ullikummi on his shoulder.

Ullikummi grew quickly until he reached the heavens. Ullikummi's brother Teshub thundered and rained on Ullikummi, but it did not harm him. Teshub fled and abdicated the throne. Teshub asked Ea for help. Ea visited Upelluri and cut off the feet of Ullikummi, toppling him

Notes

References

Sources

 Burkert, Walter. (1979). "Von Ullikummi zum Kaukasus: Die Felsgeburt des Unholds", Würzburger Jahrbücher N.F., 5, pp 253–261.
 Burkert, Walter. Oriental and Greek Mythology, pp. 19–24.
 Guterbock, Hans Gustav (1951–1952). "The Song of Ullikummi: Revised Text of the Hittite Version of a Hurrian Myth" Journal of Cuneiform Studies 5 (4), pp 135–161, (1951); 6 (1), pp 8–42, (1952) and in succeeding issues.
 Haas, Volkert. (2006). Die hethitische Literatur: Texte, Stilistik, Motive. Berlin: Walter de Gruyter, pp 130–176.
 Hoffner, H. A. Jr. (1990). "The Song of Hedammu". Hittite Myths, pp 48–57.  Atlanta.

External links

Hurrian legendary creatures